Eythra is a former settlement near Leipzig, Germany. It is archaeologically important because it is one of the sites of Europe's oldest civilisation. The village Eythra was demolished in the 1980s to make way for an open pit lignite mine. Its territory is now part of the municipalities of Leipzig and Zwenkau.

References

Archaeological sites in Germany
History of Leipzig